Dora and the Lost City of Gold is a 2019 American adventure comedy film directed by James Bobin. It is a live-action adaptation of the Nick Jr. animated television series Dora the Explorer as well as the Nickelodeon animated series Dora and Friends. The film stars Isabela Moner, Eugenio Derbez, Michael Peña, Eva Longoria, with Danny Trejo as the voice of Boots. The titular Lost City of Gold is based on the legendary Inca city, Paititi. Dora and the Lost City of Gold was produced by Paramount Players and Nickelodeon Movies in association with Walden Media, MRC and Burr! Productions, and distributed by Paramount Pictures.

A live-action Dora film was announced in 2017, and Moner was cast in the title role in May 2018. Most of the other lead cast members were hired throughout the rest of the year, and filming took place from August to December 2018 in Australia and Peru. This film is set after the events of the animated original television series and was also the first film based on a Nick Jr. series.

Dora and the Lost City of Gold was theatrically released in the United States by Paramount Pictures on August 9, 2019, the same day in which the final five unaired episodes of the original series aired on Nick Jr. The film received generally positive reviews from critics, who praised Moner's performance and the self-aware humor and grossed $120 million worldwide against a budget of $49 million.

On February 15, 2022, Paramount+ announced development of a live action series, said to be “in the same spirit as the recent live action film for older audiences”.

Plot

Deep in the Peruvian jungle, 6-year-old Dora Márquez, daughter of jungle explorers Cole and Elena, spends her days going on adventures with her monkey friend Boots, her 7-year-old cousin Diego, and imaginary friends Backpack and Map while thwarting Swiper the thieving fox. One day, Diego and his family leave to Los Angeles while Dora and her parents remain searching for the hidden Inca city of gold, Parapata.

After 10 years of exploring, Dora's parents decipher the location of Parapata and choose to send a now 16-year-old Dora to Diego's high school in Los Angeles while they travel to the lost city. Staying with a now 17-year-old Diego and his family, Dora meets fellow students Sammy and Randy. Due to Dora’s intelligence, Sammy sees her as her rival. Still, Randy is amused by Dora’s intelligence and her being very nice to him and develops a crush on her. Dora enjoys her new life, but Diego is embarrassed by her eccentric behavior; it culminates in mocking and name-calling by several of their peers when Dora publicly dances to a conga song at the school dance. As Diego walks outside, Dora tries to comfort him, but Diego says that she is no longer in the jungle, which leads to a fallout between them.

The following day, on a class field trip to a museum, Dora and the others are lured to its off-exhibit archives, where they are captured by mercenaries led by Powell who fly them to Peru. When they land, a man named Alejandro, who claims to be a friend of Dora's parents, helps them escape. In the process, the mercenaries, aided by Swiper, steal Dora's map. Alejandro reports that Dora's parents have gone missing and that the mercenaries are searching for them in hopes of getting into Parapata to steal its treasures. Dora resolves to find her parents first with Alejandro's help, while Diego comes along to look after Dora, with the other teens tagging along in hopes of being rescued.

The group travels through numerous obstacles, including quicksand, Inca ruin puzzles, hallucination-inducing spores that turned them into animated characters in the style of the original cartoon, and attacks from forest guards of Parapata. During the journey, Sammy warms up to Dora and becomes nicer to everyone. Dora and Diego eventually reconcile and Dora notices Diego has a crush on Sammy. After numerous hazards, Dora reaches her parents just outside the borders of Parapata, but Alejandro reveals he was the mercenaries' leader all along and captures them. The other teens are caught as well, but Boots appears and helps them escape. With Dora's parents still prisoners, Boots helps Dora find her confidence and she tells the teens that they need to find the way inside Parapata to acquire the treasure so they can use it to bargain for Elena and Cole's release.

Inside the hidden city, Dora and the others solve its temple's puzzles and dodge its traps, bringing them to the central shrine. Alejandro, having secretly followed them, arrives as the group reaches its final test. While he thinks that the gold is the right answer, Dora warns him that the test could have bad answers for those who fail it and that she and her friends are safe while he stands on the trap, which soon opens and Alejandro falls in it. The soldiers guarding Parapata had apprehended Dora's parents and the mercenaries as they confront the teens. Dora speaks to their queen in Quechua, assuring that the kids only came for her parents and to learn. Dora figures out the answer to the test and the Incas allow her and everyone to have a single glimpse of their greatest treasure, until Swiper appears and steals the smaller idol, thus angering the gods. As Alejandro and the mercenaries are taken away, Dora regains the idol and puts it back into place.

After the group leaves, Diego and Sammy become a couple. Dora's parents and the teens arrive at her jungle home, where the other teens' parents are waiting and are happy to see them. Her parents discuss going on another expedition as a family, but Dora decides to return to school in Los Angeles.

During the credits at the high school dance, Dora and her friends sing "We Did It" as they celebrate their victory of finding Parapata, Alejandro remains a prisoner in Parapata for another 1,000 years, and Cole and Elena stop Swiper from running away with their Inca item.

Cast
 Isabela Moner as Dora, a 16-year-old jungle explorer and the main protagonist from Dora the Explorer. She is Cole and Elena's daughter and Diego's cousin. Moner also voices Dora in the spore scene.
 Madelyn Miranda as young Dora
 Eugenio Derbez as Alejandro Gutierrez, a treasure hunter who introduces himself as a professor at the National University of San Marcos. However, he ends up being the boss of the mercenaries. Some of his known treasure heists include the Crown Jewels of the Ivory Coast and the Comtesse de Vendome. Derbez also voices Alejandro in the spore scene.
 Michael Peña as Cole Marquez, a jungle explorer who's Dora's father and Diego’s uncle.
 Eva Longoria as Elena Marquez, a jungle explorer who's Dora's mother and Diego’s aunt.
 Jeff Wahlberg as Diego, Dora's cousin and the main protagonist of Go, Diego, Go! who becomes Sammy’s boyfriend. Wahlberg also voices Diego in the spore scene.
 Malachi Barton as young Diego
 Madeleine Madden as Sammy Moore, a teenage girl who is friends with Dora, Diego and Randy and becomes Diego’s girlfriend. Madden also voices Sammy in the spore scene.
 Nicholas Coombe as Randy Warren, a teenage boy who is friends with Dora, Diego and Sammy and has a crush on Dora. Coombe also voices Randy in the spore scene.
 Temuera Morrison as Powell, a mercenary who serves as Alejandro's second-in-command.
 Christopher Kirby as Viper, a mercenary who had a history of being "yo-yo'd".
 Natasa Ristic as Christina X, a female mercenary.
 Christopher Rawlins as a mercenary
 Adriana Barraza as Abuelita Valerie, Dora and Diego's grandmother.
 Pia Miller as Sabrina, Dora's aunt and Diego's mother.
 Joey Vieira as Nico, Dora's uncle and Diego's father.
 Q'orianka Kilcher as Princess Kawillaka, the ruler of Parapata.
 Isela Vega as the Old Woman, Princess Kawillaka's old form.

Voice cast
 Danny Trejo as Boots, a monkey who is Dora's best friend and partner.
 Dee Bradley Baker provides Boots' vocal effects.
 Benicio del Toro as Swiper, a sneaky red fox who conspires to swipe useful things from Dora and has allied with the mercenaries.
 Marc Weiner as Map, an imaginary, anthropomorphic version of Dora’s map who shows Dora where she needs to go. Weiner reprises his role from the original series.
 Sasha Toro as Backpack, an imaginary, anthropomorphic version of Dora’s backpack who carries any item that Dora may need. Toro reprises her role from the original series.

Production
On October 24, 2017, a deal was struck for a live-action version of the television series to be made, with James Bobin directing. Nicholas Stoller and Danielle Sanchez-Witzel were hired to pen a script. Michael Bay's Platinum Dunes was announced as producer, though Bay and the company were ultimately not involved.

The film depicts a teenage version of Dora. It was issued an initial release date of August 2, 2019. In May 2018, Isabela Moner was cast to play Dora. Eugenio Derbez began negotiations to join in June, and was confirmed to appear in July. Micke Moreno was originally cast to play Diego, but withdrew and was replaced by Jeff Wahlberg. Eva Longoria and Michael Peña were cast as Dora's parents that August. Madeleine Madden also joined the cast of the film. In October, Q'orianka Kilcher was added to the cast, and in November, Pia Miller was set to play Dora's aunt Sabrina. In December 2018, Benicio del Toro joined as the voice of Swiper, and in March 2019, Danny Trejo announced that he had been cast as the voice of Boots the Monkey.

In an interview with Forbes, Moner stated that she learned Quechua language for the character. She said that the film would "take audiences to Machu Picchu" to "explore the Incan culture," and commented that "Dora is very cultured and she knows everything about everything," and that she "doesn't have a defined ethnicity." 
Filming began on August 6, 2018, on the Gold Coast, Queensland, Australia, and concluded on December 7, 2018. on May 3,2019 it was revealed that Marc Weiner would be reprising his role as the voice of Map from the animated series 

The visual effects are provided by Mill Film, Moving Picture Company and Cheap Shot VFX, supervised by Lindy De Quattro, Andy Brown and Richard Little with visualization services provided by Proof and 2D animation provided by Blink Industries.

Release
The film was released on August 9, 2019, the same day that the 2000 television animated series ends. It was previously slated for August 2, 2019.

Home media
Dora and the Lost City of Gold was released on Digital HD on November 5, 2019, and later on DVD and Blu-ray on November 19, 2019. The film is also available on Amazon Prime and Paramount+.

Reception

Box office
Dora and the Lost City of Gold grossed $60.5 million in the United States and Canada, and $60.1 million in other territories for a worldwide total of $120.6 million against a production budget of $49 million.

In the United States and Canada, the film was released alongside The Kitchen, The Art of Racing in the Rain, Scary Stories to Tell in the Dark and Brian Banks, and was projected to gross $15–20 million from 3,500 theaters in its opening weekend. In India the film was released in English, Hindi, Telugu and Tamil languages and became a blockbuster. The film made $6.7 million on its first day, including $1.25 million from Thursday night previews. It went into debut to $17 million, finishing fourth at the box office; 46% of its audience was Latino, while 32% were Caucasian, 11% African-American and 10% Asian. It dropped 51% in its second weekend to $8.5 million, finishing sixth. It then made $5.3 million in its third weekend and $4.1 million in its fourth, and $2.7 million in its fifth.

Critical response
The site's critical consensus reads, "Led by a winning performance from Isabela Moner, Dora and the Lost City of Gold is a family-friendly adventure that retains its source material's youthful spirit." Metacritic gave the film a weighted average score of 63 out of 100, based on 23 critics, indicating "generally favorable reviews." Audiences polled by CinemaScore gave the film an average grade of "A" on an A+ to F scale, while PostTrak reported that adult and children filmgoers gave it an average of 4.5 and 3.5 stars out of 5, respectively.

Peter Debruge of Variety wrote, "Whereas most of the cast (and especially Derbez) play broad, borderline-slapstick versions of their characters, Moner has the wide eyes and ever-chipper attitude we associate with Dora, but adds a level of charisma the animated character couldn't convey."

References

External links

 

2019 films
2019 adventure films
2010s adventure comedy films
2010s children's adventure films
2010s children's comedy films
2010s children's fantasy films
2010s fantasy comedy films
American adventure comedy films
American children's adventure films
Indigenous cinema in Latin America
American children's comedy films
American children's fantasy films
American films with live action and animation
American fantasy adventure films
American fantasy comedy films
Dora the Explorer
Films directed by James Bobin
Films scored by John Debney
Films scored by Germaine Franco
Films about friendship
Films set in Los Angeles
Films set in Peru
Films shot in Queensland
Films shot on the Gold Coast, Queensland
Films with screenplays by Nicholas Stoller
Hispanic and Latino American comedy films
Nickelodeon Movies films
Live-action films based on animated series
Paramount Pictures films
Paramount Players films
Teen adventure films
Walden Media films
Films set in 2009
Films set in 2019
2019 comedy films
Films shot at Village Roadshow Studios
2010s English-language films
2010s American films